Morrill is a city in Brown County, Kansas, United States.  As of the 2020 census, the population of the city was 218.

History
Morrill was laid out in 1878 when the St. Joseph and Western Railroad was extended to that point. It was named for Kansas governor Edmund Needham Morrill.

Geography
Morrill is located at  (39.929879, -95.694498).

Demographics

2010 census
As of the census of 2010, there were 230 people, 88 households, and 66 families residing in the city. The racial makeup of the city was 96.5% White, 1.3% Native American, and 2.2% from two or more races. Hispanic or Latino of any race were 2.2% of the population.

There were 88 households, of which 36.4% had children under the age of 18 living with them, 62.5% were married couples living together, 6.8% had a female householder with no husband present, 5.7% had a male householder with no wife present, and 25.0% were non-families. 20.5% of all households were made up of individuals, and 8% had someone living alone who was 65 years of age or older. The average household size was 2.61 and the average family size was 2.91.

The median age in the city was 38 years. 27% of residents were under the age of 18; 5.7% were between the ages of 18 and 24; 24.4% were from 25 to 44; 32.6% were from 45 to 64; and 10.4% were 65 years of age or older. The gender makeup of the city was 49.6% male and 50.4% female.

2000 census
As of the census of 2000, there were 277 people, 101 households, and 75 families residing in the city. The racial makeup of the city was 96.03% White, 1.44% African American, 0.36% Pacific Islander, and 2.17% from two or more races. Hispanic or Latino of any race were 0.36% of the population.

There were 101 households, out of which 35.6% had children under the age of 18 living with them, 64.4% were married couples living together, 6.9% had a female householder with no husband present, and 24.8% were non-families. 22.8% of all households were made up of individuals, and 6.9% had someone living alone who was 65 years of age or older. The average household size was 2.74 and the average family size was 3.24.

In the city, the population was spread out, with 30.3% under the age of 18, 7.6% from 18 to 24, 28.9% from 25 to 44, 22.7% from 45 to 64, and 10.5% who were 65 years of age or older. The median age was 36 years. For every 100 females, there were 95.1 males. For every 100 females age 18 and over, there were 107.5 males.

The median income for a household in the city was $30,357, and the median income for a family was $32,813. Males had a median income of $30,250 versus $17,500 for females. The per capita income for the city was $11,924. About 24.7% of families and 34.0% of the population were below the poverty line, including 56.8% of those under the age of eighteen and none of those 65 or over.

Education
The community is served by Prairie Hills USD 113 public school district, formed in 2010 by the merger of Sabetha USD 441 and Axtel USD 488.

Morrill High School was closed through school unification. The Morrill High School mascot was Tigers.

Notable people
 Howard Shultz Miller, former U.S. Representative from Kansas.

References

External links
 Morrill - Directory of Public Officials
 Morrill city map, KDOT

Cities in Kansas
Cities in Brown County, Kansas
1878 establishments in Kansas
Populated places established in 1878